Peter Buchholz (born 1941) is a South African philologist who is Professor Emeritus at the University of South Africa. He specializes in Germanic studies.

Biography
Peter Buchholz was born in Pretoria, South Africa in 1941. He gained his habilitation in Germanic Philology at the University of Kiel in 1977. Buchholz has taught at the universities of Saarland, Kiel, Berkeley, and Sorbonne. In 1981, Bucholz was appointed Professor at the Department of Modern European Languages at the University of South Africa. He retired as Professor Emeritus in 2003. Bucholz has published a large number of scholarly works on Old Norse religion and literature.

See also
 Jan de Vries
 Otto Höfler
 Edgar C. Polomé
 Georges Dumézil
 Gabriel Turville-Petre
 Rudolf Simek
 John Lindow
 Hilda Ellis Davidson

Selected works
 Möglichkeiten und Grenzen einer germanischen Religionsgeschichte, 1966
 Bibliographie zur alteuropäischen Religionsgeschichte, 1954-1964
 Literatur zu den antiken Rand- und Nachfolgekulturen im außermediterranen Europa unter besonderer Berücksichtigung der nichtchristlichen Religionen, 1967
 Schamanistische Züge in der altisländischen Überlieferung, 1968
 A Bibliographical Introduction to Mediaeval Scandinavia, 1972
 Vorzeitkunde. Mündliches Erzählen und Überliefern im mittelalterlichen Skandinavien nach dem Zeugnis von Fornaldarsaga und eddischer Dichtung, 1980

Sources
 
 

1941 births
Germanic studies scholars
Old Norse studies scholars
Academic staff of Paris-Sorbonne University
People from Pretoria
Philologists
Academic staff of Saarland University
South African non-fiction writers
Writers on Germanic paganism
University of California, Berkeley faculty
University of Kiel alumni
Academic staff of the University of Kiel
Academic staff of the University of South Africa
Living people